Bobby Alexander may refer to:
 Bobby Alexander (footballer), Scottish footballer
 Bobby Alexander (rugby union), South African rugby union player